"Vissi d'arte" is a soprano aria from act 2 of the opera Tosca by Giacomo Puccini. It is sung by Floria Tosca as she thinks of her fate, how the life of her beloved, Mario Cavaradossi, is at the mercy of Baron Scarpia and why God has seemingly abandoned her. The vocal range is E4 to B5.

Libretto

References

External links

 , televised performance by Renata Tebaldi, 1959 
  by Renata Tebaldi 
 
 Analysis, discussion: Rhiannon Giddens, Sondra Radvanovsky, Rufus Wainwright, Vivien Schweitzer; WQXR-FM, podcast at WNYC Studios (25:00)
 , Angela Gheorghiu

Arias by Giacomo Puccini
Opera excerpts
Soprano arias